Lakhminia is a village in Begusarai district in the Indian state of Bihar. The village is home to the Lakhminia railway station.

See also
 Lakhminia railway station

References

 
Villages in Begusarai district